Sergey Lyubomirov (born 23 September 1968) is a Russian sports shooter. He competed in the men's trap event at the 2000 Summer Olympics.

References

1968 births
Living people
Russian male sport shooters
Olympic shooters of Russia
Shooters at the 2000 Summer Olympics
Sportspeople from Moscow